The 1951 Eastern Illinois Panthers football team represented Eastern Illinois State College (now known as Eastern Illinois University) as a member of the Interstate Intercollegiate Athletic Conference (IIAC) during the 1951 college football season. The team was led by Rex Darling in his first and only season as head coach and played their home games at Lincoln Field in Charleston, Illinois. The Panthers finished the season with a 4–2–2 record overall and a 2–2–2 record in conference play, placing fourth in the IIAC.

Schedule

References

Eastern Illinois
Eastern Illinois Panthers football seasons
Eastern Illinois Panthers football